Teemu Rannikko (born September 9, 1980) is a Finnish professional basketball player. He is 1.89 m (6' 2 ") tall, and he weighs 88 kg (195 lbs.). He mainly plays at the point guard position. At his peak, he was known as a good scorer and a steady defender.

Professional career
Born in Turku, Finland, Rannikko made his breakthrough when he transferred to Scavoloni Pesaro, in 2004–05, and he made his EuroLeague debut that season. He had his most successful seasons over the next two years in Union Olimpija, where he was one of the key players for the team that played in the EuroLeague. In 2007–08, he moved to BC Khimki, where he played his first season as a sixth man successfully, but in the second season, an injury stopped Rannikko from breaking through, and he moved again after two years in Khimki. He spent the next three seasons in CB Granada and Pallacanestro Varese. On July 31, 2012, he returned to Union Olimpija, where he mostly played off the bench, so he later moved to his home club Kataja.

In 2013, Rannikko returned to Finland, when he signed with Joensuun Kataja. In the 2014–15 season, Rannikko was named the Korisliiga MVP and Korisliiga Finals MVP, after he was a member of Kataja's first championship team in history.

In 2017, Kataja won the Korisliiga again, after beating Vilpas Vikings 4–2 in the league's finals, and Rannikko won his second Finals MVP award.

National team career
Rannikko was a long-time member of the senior Finnish national basketball team. With Finland, he played at the 2011 EuroBasket, the 2013 EuroBasket, the 2014 FIBA World Cup, and the 2017 EuroBasket.

Career statistics

EuroLeague

|-
| style="text-align:left;"| 2004–05
| style="text-align:left;"| Scavolini Pesaro
| 19 || 6 || 18.1 || .333 || .316 || .864 || 1.3 || 1.2 || 1.1 || .0 || 4.3 || 4.3
|-
| style="text-align:left;"| 2005–06
| rowspan=3 style="text-align:left;"| Union Olimpija
| 14 || 14 || 31.4 || .445 || .364 || .865 || 2.1 || 3.1 || 1.4 || .1 || 12.8 || 14.5
|-
| style="text-align:left;"| 2006–07
| 13 || 11 || 31.4 || .395 || .368 || .800 || 1.4 || 3.3 || 1.1 || .0 || 14.6 || 13.8
|-
| style="text-align:left;"| 2012–13
| 9 || 0 || 17.5 || .231 || .235 || .900 || 0.7 || 2.4 || 0.1 || .0 || 2.8 || 2.3
|- class="sortbottom"
| colspan=2 style="text-align:center;"| Career
| 55 || 31 || 24.6 || .388 || .344 || .836 || 1.4 || 1.2 || 1.0 || .0 || 8.6 || 8.8

References

External links

Euroleague.net Profile
EuroCup Profile

1980 births
Living people
ABA League players
BC Khimki players
CB Granada players
Finnish expatriate basketball people in Italy
Finnish expatriate basketball people in Russia
Finnish expatriate basketball people in Spain
Finnish men's basketball players
Kataja BC players
KK Olimpija players
Lega Basket Serie A players
Liga ACB players
Pallacanestro Varese players
Point guards
Pallacanestro Reggiana players
Roseto Sharks players
Sportspeople from Turku
Victoria Libertas Pallacanestro players
2014 FIBA Basketball World Cup players